Harry Winkler was an American sitcom writer who wrote for such shows as The George Gobel Show, The Addams Family, The Doris Day Show, and others. He shared an Emmy award in 1955 for The George Gobel Show and was nominated the following year for the same show. In that same year, 1956, one of his television scripts was featured in The Prize Plays of Television and Radio 1956, published by Random House.

Winkler also wrote the groundbreaking series Julia starring Diahann Carroll, the first commercial television series to star an African-American female in the lead role of a single, professional woman with a family to support. He also wrote the original treatment "The Flagstones" for what ultimately became known as The Flintstones. Additional credits include having been the ghost writer for the Blondie comic strip series for over 25 years, 1955 through 1980. He also wrote for a wide variety of other comedy series ranging from Petticoat Junction, to The Brady Bunch, to The Odd Couple.

In 2014, Winkler received a posthumous award from the Writers Guild of America for his work on The Odd Couple television series, a script from which was designated one of the top 100 television screenplays during the first 75 years of commercial television. He is also the author of three novels and a theatrical play, Edges.

References

External links

American television writers
American male television writers
Year of death missing